Heart Strings is a 1917 American silent drama film directed by and starring Allen Holubar.

Cast
 Allen Holubar as Dr. John McLean
 Francelia Billington as Johanna
 Paul Byron as Gerald
 Maude George as Leonie
 Virginia Lee Corbin as Johanna - as a child
 Charles Cummings as Hartley
 Irene Hunt as Sue
 Mattie Witting as Housekeeper
 Zoe Rae as Undetermined Role

References

Bibliography
 Robert B. Connelly. The Silents: Silent Feature Films, 1910-36, Volume 40, Issue 2. December Press, 1998.

External links
 

1917 films
1917 drama films
1910s English-language films
American silent feature films
Silent American drama films
American black-and-white films
Universal Pictures films
Films directed by Allen Holubar
1910s American films